The 2011–12 FC Shakhtar Donetsk season saw the club complete a domestic double, winning their seventh Ukrainian Premier League and eight Ukrainian Cup whilst losing the Ukrainian Super Cup to FC Dynamo Kyiv. Shakhtar also competed in the UEFA Champions League, where they finished fourth in their group, and were eliminated from the competition.

Squad

Out on loan

Transfers

In

Out

Loans out

Released

Competitions

Overall

Super Cup

Premier League

Table

Results summary

Results by round

Results

Ukrainian Cup

UEFA Champions League

Group stage

Squad statistics

Appearances and goals

|-
|colspan="14"|Players away from Shakhtar Donetsk on loan:

|-
|colspan="14"|Players that left Shakhtar Donetsk during the season:

|}

Goal scorers

Clean sheets

Disciplinary record

References

FC Shakhtar Donetsk seasons
Shakhtar Donetsk
Shakhtar Donetsk
Ukrainian football championship-winning seasons